Frijid Pink is the debut album by American rock band Frijid Pink. It was originally released early 1970 by London Records' now-defunct Parrot subsidiary label (cat. no. PAS 71033). "Tell Me Why" reached #70 in Canada in May 1969.

Track listing errors
The album was released on German CD (1991, Repertoire Records) including two bonus tracks ("Heartbreak Hotel" and "Music For The People") that were originally released as singles in 1970 and 1971, respectively. One of the CD later re-releases, being the most widely distributed copies, were missing tracks 5 and 6 of the nine tracks on the original LP.

Track listing
"God Gave Me You" (Gary Ray Thompson, Tom Beaudry) - 3:35
"Crying Shame" (Michael Valvano) - 3:11
"I'm On My Way" (Thompson, Beaudry) - 4:34
"Drivin' Blues" (Thompson, Beaudry) - 3:14
"Tell Me Why" (Thompson, Beaudry) - 2:50
"End Of The Line" (Thompson, Beaudry) - 4:07
"House of the Rising Sun" (Traditional, arr. Frijid Pink) - 4:44
"I Want To Be Your Lover" (Thompson, Beaudry, Valvano) - 7:30
"Boozin' Blues" (Thompson, Beaudry) - 6:01
"Heartbreak Hotel" (Mae Boren Axton, Thomas Durden, Elvis Presley) (bonus track) - 2:49
"Music For The People" (Thompson, Beaudry) (bonus track) - 2:54

Charts

Personnel

Kelly Green - lead vocals
Gary Ray Thompson - guitar
Tom Harris - bass
Richard Stevers - drums

Additional:
Larry Zelanka - keyboards

References

1970 debut albums
Frijid Pink albums
Parrot Records albums